Horst Fleps (born April 3, 1961) is a German-American retired soccer forward who played professionally in the Major Indoor Soccer League and United Soccer League.

In 1980 Fleps signed with the Chicago Horizons of the Major Indoor Soccer League, playing one season with the team.  On July 14, 1982, he moved to the Oklahoma City Slickers of the American Soccer League.  He had signed with the Slickers in February, but his West German citizenship prevented him from joining the team because it had its limit of foreign players.  He gained his citizenship on July 13, 1982 and joined the Slickers the next day.  Both the Slickers and the league collapsed after the 1983 season.  On June 14, 1984, Fleps signed with the Rochester Flash of the United Soccer League for the 1984 outdoor season. That fall he moved back indoors with the Canton Invaders of the American Indoor Soccer Association.  He then bounced to a new team each season until 1987.

External links
 Career stats

References

Living people
1961 births
Sportspeople from Wuppertal
American soccer players
American Indoor Soccer Association players
American Soccer League (1933–1983) players
Canton Invaders players
Chicago Horizons players
Chicago Shoccers players
Fort Wayne Flames players
Major Indoor Soccer League (1978–1992) players
Oklahoma City Slickers (ASL) players
Rochester Flash players
United Soccer League (1984–85) players
Association football forwards
Milwaukee Wave players
German footballers
German expatriate footballers
Expatriate soccer players in the United States
Footballers from North Rhine-Westphalia